Peru competed at the 1968 Summer Olympics in Mexico City, Mexico. 28 competitors, 16 men and 12 women, took part in 21 events in 8 sports.

Athletics

Peru qualified four athletes to the summer olympics.
Track events

Field events

Boxing

Fencing

Men's foil
 Enrique Barúa

Rowing

Peru qualified the following boat.

Qualification Legend: FA=Final A (medal); FB=Final B (non-medal); FC=Final C (non-medal); FD=Final D (non-medal); FE=Final E (non-medal); FF=Final F (non-medal); SA/B=Semifinals A/B; SC/D=Semifinals C/D; SE/F=Semifinals E/F; Q=Quarterfinals; R=Repechage

Shooting

Five shooter represented Peru during these Olympics. Gladys Baldwin Lopez was one of the first two women, the other being Eulalia Rolińska who competed for Poland, to compete in Olympic Shooting.

Pistol

Rifle

Swimming

Three swimmers competed in seven events.

Men

Women

Volleyball

Team Roster
Olga Asato
Irma Cordero
Luisa Fuentes
Esperanza Jiménez
Teresa Nuñez
Ana María Ramírez
Aida Reyna
Alicia Sánchez
Norma Velarde
Results
All times are Mexico Central Zone (UTC−5)
Women's Team Competition
Peru's women's volleyball team made its first appearance at the olympics where it finished fourth.

Weightlifting

Peru had one athlete.

References

External links
Official Olympic Reports

Nations at the 1968 Summer Olympics
1968
1968 in Peruvian sport